Lloyd Fernandez Avery II (June 21, 1969 – September 4, 2005) was an American actor. He appeared in John Singleton's Oscar-nominated film Boyz n the Hood (1991) as one of the Bloods who murdered high school football star Ricky Baker (played by Morris Chestnut) and was later killed by Doughboy in retaliation. In 2005, Avery was convicted of double homicide, and later killed in prison by his cellmate.

Early life 
Born in Los Angeles, California, Avery grew up in View Park where he attended Beverly Hills High School. Avery was of African and Mexican descent.

Career 
Shortly after Avery's film debut in Boyz n the Hood, Singleton would cast Avery once again in his next film, Poetic Justice (1993). 

Avery re-emerged in 2000 starring as Nate in the film Lockdown and as G-Ride in the 2001 independent film Shot.

Arrest and death 
In 2001, soon after wrapping Shot, Avery was arrested and charged with a double homicide for shooting two random people, for which he was sentenced to life imprisonment. He was murdered on September 4, 2005 in Crescent City, California at the age of 36, after the brutality and strangulation from his Pelican Bay State Prison cellmate Kevin Roby as part of a Satanic ritual "intended as a warning to God."

Filmography

Film

Television

References

External links 

 

1969 births
2005 deaths
20th-century American male actors
African-American male actors
American actors of Mexican descent
American male film actors
American male television actors
American people who died in prison custody
American people convicted of murder
American prisoners sentenced to life imprisonment
Beverly Hills High School alumni
Burials at Inglewood Park Cemetery
Crimes involving Satanism or the occult
Deaths by beating in the United States
Deaths by strangulation in the United States
Male actors from Los Angeles
Male murder victims
Murdered African-American people
People murdered in California
Prisoners murdered in custody
Prisoners sentenced to life imprisonment by California
Prisoners who died in California detention